Outlaw Blues is a 1977 American drama film directed by Richard T. Heffron and starring Peter Fonda and Susan Saint James. Written by Bill L. Norton, the film is about an ex-convict and songwriter trying to break into the music business in Austin, Texas. The soundtrack of the film includes a title song written by John Oates and three songs by Hoyt Axton, with some of the songs sung by Peter Fonda.<ref>[https://www.tcm.com/tcmdb/title/85996/outlaw-blues#overviewTurner Classic Movies: Outlaw Blues (1977)]</ref>

Plot
Ex-convict Bobby Ogden (Peter Fonda) is trying to get his life straight and his career going as a country and western singer. Bobby shows off some of his tunes to Nashville star Garland Dupree (James Callahan). However, Dupree uses one of his songs "Outlaw Blues" for himself with no credit to Bobby. Bobby confronts Dupree and when Dupree pulls a gun on him, he accidentally shoots himself in the ensuing struggle. Of course, Dupree tells everyone that Bobby shot him.  Now Bobby's on the run, with only Dupree's recently fired back up singer Tina Waters (Susan Saint James) believing him. The pair flee together, as Bobby becomes an underground hero who is accepted as the man who actually wrote the hit, while being put on the law enforcement's most wanted list.

Cast
 Peter Fonda as Bobby Ogden 
 Susan Saint James as Tina Waters
 John Crawford as Chief Buzz Cavenaugh 
 James T. Callahan as Garland Dupree 
 Michael Lerner as Hatch
 Steve Fromholz as Elroy
 Richard Lockmiller as Associate Warden
 Matt Clark as Billy Bob
 Jan Rita Cobler as Cathy Moss
 Gene Rader as Leon Warback
 Curtis Harris as Big Guy
 Jerry Greene as Disc Jockey
 Dave Helfert as Anchorman
 Jeffrey Friedman (politician) as Newsman
 James N. Harrell as Cop Chauffeur

Production

Filming locationsOutlaw Blues was filmed on location in Austin, Texas and Huntsville, Texas.

Reception
In his review in The New York Times, film critic A. H. Weiler found the film to be "pleasantly palatable it not especially nutritious" and "an amiable, lilting, if lightweight, diversion." Weiler acknowledges that the cast "make the most of a musical genre that has millions of devoted fans."

On the aggregate reviewer web site Rotten Tomatoes'', the film received a 63% positive viewer rating based on 86 user ratings.

References

External links
 
 
 
 

1977 films
Films directed by Richard T. Heffron
American drama films
Warner Bros. films
Films scored by Charles Bernstein
Films set in Austin, Texas
Films shot in Austin, Texas
1970s English-language films
1970s American films